J25 may refer to:
 Gyroelongated pentagonal rotunda, a Johnson solid (J25)
 Honda J25, an automobile engine
 Jennings J-25, a pistol
 LNER Class J25, a British steam locomotive class
 Malaysia Federal Route J25